Reaching is a public artwork by artist Zenos Frudakis, located in downtown Indianapolis, Indiana, United States. It is a figurative bronze portrait of a nude male and female. Each figure is leaping and reaching, arms outstretched toward the other.

See also
List of public art in Indianapolis

References

Outdoor sculptures in Indianapolis
Culture of Indianapolis
1987 sculptures
Bronze sculptures in Indiana